Since the establishment of the competition in 1903, seven Australians have led the general classification in the Tour de France at the end of a stage during one of the 102 Tours de France. 
One of the three Grand Tours of professional stage road cycling, the Tour de France is the most famous road cycling event in the world, and is held annually in the month of July. Although all riders compete together, the winners of the Tour are divided into classifications, each best known by the coloured jersey that is worn by the leader of it; the general classification (GC), represented by the yellow jersey (French: maillot jaune), is for the overall leader in terms of the lowest time. The other individual classifications in the Tour de France are the points classification, also known as the sprinters' classification (green jersey), the mountains classification (polka dot jersey), and the young rider classification (white jersey).

In the 102 editions of the Tour de France to 2015, only seven Australian riders have worn the yellow jersey. The first was Phil Anderson, who in 1981 became the first ever non-European to lead the general classification at the Tour de France when he wore the yellow jersey on Stage 7 on 1 July. Of the seven Australians to wear it to date, three are considered to be "general classification riders" (that is, riders who are aiming to win the GC, as opposed to competing in another classification or riding as a domestique): Anderson in 1981 and 1982, Cadel Evans in 2008, 2010 and 2011 and Simon Gerrans in 2013. Stuart O'Grady and Robbie McEwen are sprint specialists, and were successful in the points classification competition in the years when they also wore the yellow jersey; as a result of winning stages early in the race, they received time bonuses which gave them the leadership of the GC for a small number of days early in the Tour. Brad McGee was the reigning world champion in the 4000 m individual pursuit when he won the opening prologue time trial, which was similar in length, in 2003. Simon Gerrans gained his Yellow Jersey after Orica–GreenEDGE's victory in the Stage 4 team time trial around Nice on 2 July 2013. Rohan Dennis, while a former hour record holder, was riding the Tour de France in support of Tejay van Garderen when he won the Stage 1 individual time trial in Utrecht on 4 July 2015, thus becoming the first leader of the general classification for the 2015 Tour de France.

The seven Australians have spent a total of 32 stages in the yellow jersey out of the 2,126 total in the 102 editions of the Tour de France, as at the end of Stage 1 of the 2015 Tour.

List
"Obtained" refers to the date and stage where the rider secured the lead of the general classification at the finish; the rider would first wear the yellow jersey in the stage after, where he would start the day as leader. "Relinquished" refers to the date and stage where the rider lost the lead, and therefore was not wearing the yellow jersey the following stage.

Notes

A. : This was the first time a non-European cyclist was leader of the general classification.
B. : Finished first in the young rider classification at the completion of the Tour.
C. : Finished second in the points classification at the completion of the Tour.
D. : "P" refers to the prologue event, most commonly an individual time trial (as it was in 2003). The prologue is not considered to be a numbered stage of the Tour de France, and is followed the next day by Stage "1"; therefore, the prologue is occasionally also designated as Stage "0".
E. : Finished first in the points classification at the completion of the Tour.
F. : Also won both the Green Points Jersey and the White Young Rider Jersey as the winner of Stage 1.

See also
Australian cyclists at the Tour de France
List of British cyclists who have led the Tour de France general classification
List of Dutch cyclists who have led the Tour de France general classification
Yellow jersey statistics

References

External links

Lists of cyclists
Tour de France-related lists
Tour de France
Tour de France people
Australian cyclists